Piper auritum is an aromatic culinary herb in the pepper family Piperaceae, which grows in tropical Central America. Common names include hoja santa (Spanish for "sacred leaf"), yerba santa, hierba santa, Mexican pepperleaf, acuyo, tlanepa, anisillo, root beer plant, Vera Cruz pepper and sacred pepper.

Description 
It is a perennial herbaceous plant with heart-shaped velvety leaves.
The complex flavor is not so easily described; it has been compared to eucalyptus, licorice, sassafras, anise, nutmeg, mint, tarragon, and black pepper. The flavor is stronger in the young stems and veins.

It is native to the Americas, from northern South America to Mexico, and is also cultivated in southeast Florida and California.

Usage 
It is often used in Mexican cuisine in tamales, fish or meat wrapped in its fragrant leaves for cooking, and as an essential ingredient in mole verde, a green sauce originally from the Oaxaca region of Mexico. It is also used to flavor eggs and soups like pozole. In Central Mexico, it is used to flavor chocolate drinks. In southeastern Mexico, a green liquor called verdín is made from hoja santa.

While typically used fresh, it is also used dried, although the drying process removes much of the flavor and makes the leaf too brittle to be used as a wrapper.

Chemistry / Constituents 
The leaf oil of Piper auritum contains a relatively high concentration of safrole, around 70%.  A few of the other 40 constituents occurring in minor quantities were α-thujene, α-pinene, camphene, β-pinene, myrcene, and limonene.

References

External links 
 Piper auritum leaf

auritum
Flora of Mexico
Flora of Belize
Flora of Costa Rica
Flora of El Salvador
Flora of Guatemala
Flora of Honduras
Flora of Nicaragua
Flora of Panama
Flora of Jamaica
Crops originating from the Americas
Mexican cuisine
Taxa named by Carl Sigismund Kunth
Flora without expected TNC conservation status